is a railway station in the city of Okazaki, Aichi Prefecture, Japan, operated by Central Japan Railway Company (JR Tōkai).

Lines
Nishi-Okazaki Station is served by the Tōkaidō Main Line, and is located 330.1 kilometers from the starting point of the line at Tokyo Station.

Station layout
The station has two opposed side platforms, with an elevated station building built at a right angle above the tracks and platforms.. The station building has automated ticket machines, TOICA automated turnstiles and is staffed.

Platforms

Adjacent stations

Station history
Nishi-Okazaki Station was established as a passenger train station on March 13, 1988. Automated turnstiles using the TOICA IC Card system came into operation from November 25, 2006.

Station numbering was introduced to the section of the Tōkaidō Line operated JR Central in March 2018; Nishi-Okazaki Station was assigned station number CA53.

Passenger statistics
In fiscal 2017, the station was used by an average of 1983 passengers daily.

Surrounding area
 Yasaku Minami Elementary School

See also
 List of Railway Stations in Japan

References

Yoshikawa, Fumio. Tokaido-sen 130-nen no ayumi. Grand-Prix Publishing (2002) .

External links

Railway stations in Japan opened in 1988
Railway stations in Aichi Prefecture
Tōkaidō Main Line
Stations of Central Japan Railway Company
Okazaki, Aichi